The head of The Queen's College, University of Oxford, is the Provost. The current Provost is Claire Craig who was pre-elected to serve from 2 August 2019.

List of provosts of The Queen's College, Oxford

References

 
Queen's College
Queen's College, Oxford